The 1997 Western Kentucky Hilltoppers football team represented Western Kentucky University in the 1997 NCAA Division I-AA football season and were led by quarterback Willie Taggart and head coach Jack Harbaugh. The team was an independent and earned their first NCAA Division I-AA Playoff berth since 1988, making it to the quarterfinals.  The Hilltoppers primarily ran an option offense and were ranked 1st in Rush Offence for NCAA Division I-AA.  They finished the season ranked 5th in final I-AA postseason national poll.

Western Kentucky's roster included future NFL players Rod “He Hate Me” Smart and Ben Wittman.  Patrick Goodman and Andy Hape were named to All-America teams, while Harbaugh was Division I-AA Independents and AFCA Region 3 Coach of the Year.  The I-AA Independent All-Star Team included Goodman, Bryan Heyward, Joey Stockton, Hape, Ron Kelly, and Taggart.

Schedule

References

Western Kentucky
Western Kentucky Hilltoppers football seasons
Western Kentucky Hilltoppers football